Augustus Gardner Means (June 8, 1925 – April 18, 1994) was an American businessman and politician who served as a member of the Massachusetts House of Representatives and the Massachusetts Governor's Council. He was also the Republican nominee for Massachusetts State Treasurer in 1954 and Lieutenant Governor of Massachusetts in 1960.

Early life
Means was born on June 8, 1925 in Beverly, Massachusetts to W. Gordon and Constance (Gardner) Means. He was the great-grandson of Henry Cabot Lodge and the grandson of Augustus Peabody Gardner. Means attended the Groton School and in 1944 he graduated from the Culver Military Academy.

After graduating, Means enlisted in the United States Army. He served with the 80th Infantry Division in France during World War II. He was shot in the chest outside of Bastogne when a platoon he was leading was pinned down by a concealed German machine gun. A deck of playing cards partially deflected the bullet and Means was able to crawl behind the gun and jump the soldiers manning it - killing three of them. His citations included the Distinguished Service Cross and Purple Heart.

After his discharge in January 1946, Means worked as a veterinary assistant in Wakefield, Massachusetts. He attended the University of Massachusetts Amherst and graduated from Cornell University, where he studied veterinary medicine and agriculture.

Personal life
In July 1946 he married Mary Callan. The couple first met at a dance in Boston when he was 13 and she was 11. The couple moved to Turf Meadow Farm in Essex, Massachusetts, which had been purchased by Means' father years before. Together had five children - three daughters and two sons. The couple later divorced and in May 1961 he married Jean Draper Ham, granddaughter of George A. Draper. They had two sons and one daughter.

Political career
In 1950, Means was elected to the Essex Board of Selectmen. He did some of his campaigning while collecting garbage for the town (Means used the garbage as pig feed). Later that year he was elected to the Massachusetts House of Representatives. In 1954 he was the Republican nominee for state treasurer. He lost to Democrat John Francis Kennedy 54% to 45%. In October 1955, Means was appointed to the Massachusetts Governor's Council to fill the vacancy caused by Arthur A. Thomson's appointment to the Haverhill District Court. Means was elected in his own right in 1956 and reelected in 1958. In 1960, he was the Republican nominee for Lieutenant Governor. He lost to Democrat Edward F. McLaughlin, Jr. 54% to 45%.

Business career
Means owned a large livestock farm that had a sizable amount of cattle, sheep, chickens, turkeys, bison, and hogs. He was also involved in a number of other businesses; he was president of the Essex Lumber Co., president and treasurer of Means Chevrolet-Oldsmobile in Ipswich, Massachusetts, managing director of a hotel in Aruba, and owner of a shopping center in Manchester-by-the-Sea, Massachusetts. He also served as president of the Essex County Agricultural Society, which runs the Topsfield Fair.

Later life and death
In his later years Means donated much of his 650-acre farm to the Essex County Greenbelt. Means died on April 18, 1994 in Sanibel, Florida. He was survived by his second wife and seven of his children.

See also
 1951–1952 Massachusetts legislature
 1953–1954 Massachusetts legislature

References

1925 births
1994 deaths
Businesspeople in wood products
Cornell University alumni
Farmers from Massachusetts
Members of the Massachusetts Governor's Council
Republican Party members of the Massachusetts House of Representatives
People from Beverly, Massachusetts
People from Essex, Massachusetts
People from Sanibel, Florida
Recipients of the Distinguished Service Cross (United States)
20th-century American politicians
Culver Academies alumni